The Sitia or Siteia Mountains, also known as the Sitiaka Range, are a group of four mountain ranges extending SW-NE in Lasithi in eastern Crete, Greece. Stretching from the southern coast to the plain of the city of Sitia on the northern coast, they tend to isolate east Crete from the rest of Crete, creating a refugium for the rare plant and animal species and a refuge for the ancient people practising the Minoan culture. In this ancient refuge are now to be found the ruins of Minoan sites at Mochlos, Kato Zakro, Palaikastro, and Kavousi. These are four of the major sites of East Crete, but the number of sites recorded or excavated is in the hundreds. Endemic species, many rare or endangered, are to be found in the gorges that cut from upland to ocean or valley on all sides.

Geography
The four ranges are configured in two rows, termed the West Sitia Mountains and the East Sitia Mountains. The west side is divided from the east side by the Rema Pentelis ("Pentelis river"), a stream with its valley that flows S-N across most of Crete at that point, entering the Bay of Sitia just east of Sitia. The town of Sitia (or Siteia} is situated in some flat land, the Plain of Sitia, forming a port in the Bay of Sitia. The port is a road center and major access point to East Crete. It is the site of the major services to the area: the seaport, the airport, the hospital, educational services, and so on. The villages scattered throughout the mountains and along the coast are becoming more and more summer residences catering to tourism. Some, such as Voila and Etia, have been completely abandoned, and give the appearance of an ancient ruined village.

The West Sitia Mountains comprise three ranges abutting each other south to north. The differences are entirely geomorphological or geopolitical and are conventional. The Thrypti Mountains are located in the southwest. They trend to the northeast from Ierapetra in the direction of Sitia. However, they only go half-way in that direction. The rest of the distance is completed by the distinct Ornon mountains, separated from the Thrypti by the Bebonas river valley, and the Western Siteia Foothills, of lower elevation, covering the space between the Ornon range and Siteia itself.

The East Sitia Mountains consist only of the Zakros mountains, also trending SW-NE.

Parkland
The 2015 creation of Sitia UNESCO Global Geopark placed much of the Sitia range in the park. It is the major range there, but not the only. The coastal hill range (east coast) also is in it, so the park comprises all of Crete east of the Mochlos-Livari line. The line trends NW-SE, so that much of Thrypti is actually omitted from the park.

See also
 Thrypti
 Ornon Mountains, Crete
 Western Siteia Foothills
 Zakros Mountains, Crete

Notes

Citations

External links

Mountains of Crete
Mountain ranges of Greece
Landforms of Lasithi